The Department of Works was an Australian government department that existed between November 1938 and April 1939.

Scope
Information about the department's functions and/or government funding allocation could be found in the Administrative Arrangements Orders and in the Department's annual report.

According to the Administrative Arrangements Order issued on 6 April 1939, the Department dealt with:
Geodesy (International map of the world and 129th meridian)
Lands and surveys
Properties - (a) transferred (b) acquired (c) rented
Public Works and Services
Preparation of design and execution of all Commonwealth architectural and engineering works in the States,
Northern Territory and ACT, including works for the Commonwealth Bank of Australia
Maintenance and operation of electric light, water and sewerage services in the ACT
Rivers, roads and bridges
River Murray Waters Commission

Structure
The Department was a Commonwealth Public Service department, staffed by officials who were responsible to the Minister for Works.

References

Government agencies established in 1938
Works
1938 establishments in Australia
1939 disestablishments in Australia